September 3 - Eastern Orthodox liturgical calendar - September 5

All fixed commemorations below celebrated on September 17 by Eastern Orthodox Churches on the Old Calendar.

For September 4th, Orthodox Churches on the Old Calendar commemorate the Saints listed on August 22.

Saints
 Holy Prophet and God-seer Moses, on Mount Nebo (c. 1450 B.C.) (see also: July 20; Bright Wednesday - Synaxis of All Saints of Mt. Sinai)
 Martyrs Thathuil and Bebaia of Edessa (c. 116)  (see also: January 29)
 Martyr Sarbellus (Sarvillos, Zarvilos), by stoning.
 Martyr Hermione of Ephesus, daughter of Apostle Philip the Deacon (c. 117)
 Saints Theotimos and Theodoulos the Executioners, who believed in Christ through St. Hermione, died peacefully (c. 117)
 Saint Petronius, likely the disciple of St. John the Theologian, who met St. Hermione in Ephesus (2nd century)
 Martyrs Christodoula and her sons Urban, Prilidian, and Epolonios (251)
 Hieromartyr Babylas of Antioch, Bishop of Antioch, and three students, Ammonius, Donatos and Faustus (c. 251 or c. 284)
 The 3608 (or 3628) Martyrs of Nicomedia (c. 290)  (see also: September 2)
 Martyr Babylas of Nicomedia, and with him 84 children (3rd-4th century)
 Martyrs Theodore, Ammianus, Julian, Oceanus, and Centurionus, of Nicomedia (288)
 Martyrs Kegourus, Secundinus, Secundus and their mother Jerusalem, in Veria.
 Martyr Charitina of Amisus (c. 304)  (see also: October 5, January 15)
 Saint Petronius of Egypt, disciple of St. Pachomius the Great (346)

Pre-Schism Western saints
 Saint Candida the Elder (c. 78)
 Saint Marcellus, a priest in Lyons, buried up to his waist on the banks of the Saône, where he survived for three days before he died (c. 178)
 Saint Marinus, hermit, founder of a chapel and monastery, from where the world's oldest surviving republic, San Marino, grew (4th century)
 Saint Marcellus, Bishop of Trier in Germany.
 Saint Salvinus, third Bishop of Verdun in the north of France (c. 420)
 Saint Boniface I, a priest who was elected Pope of Rome in 418 (422)
 Saint Monessa, a holy woman converted by St Patrick in Ireland (456)
 Saint Caletricus, Bishop of Chartres (c. 580)
 Saint Ultan of Ardbraccan, Bishop of Ardbraccan in Ireland (7th century)
 Saint Rhuddlad, patron of Llanrhyddlad at the foot of Moel Rhyddlad in Anglesey in Wales (7th century)
 Saint Ida of Herzfeld (c. 813)
 Saint Sulpicius of Bayeux (Sulpice), Bishop of Bayeux in France from c 838 to 843, martyred by the Vikings in Livry (843)

Post-Schism Orthodox saints
 Saint Symeon, Abbot and Wonderworker of Gareji (1773)
 Venerable Anthimus the Blind, the New Ascetic, of Cephalonia, patron saint of Astypalaia (1782)
 New Hieromartyr Parthenius, abbot, of Kiziltash Monastery in the Crimea (1867)

New martyrs and confessors
 New Hieromartyr Gregory (Lebedev), Bishop of Schlüsselburg (1937)
 New Hieromartyr Sergius (Druzhinin), Bishop of Narva (1937)
 New Hieromartyr Stephen (Kuskov), Hieromonk, of Nikolskoye, Tver (1937)
 New Hieromartyrs Paul Vasilievsky, John Vasilevsky, Nicholas Lebedev, Nicholas Sretensky, John Romashkin, Nicholas Voshtev, Alexander Nikolsky, Peter Lebedinsky, Michael Bogorodsky, Elias Izmailov, Priests (1937)
 Martyrs Basil Yezhov, Peter Lonskov, Stephen Mityushkin and Alexander Blokhin (1937)
 New Hieromartyr Peter (Zimonjić), Metropolitan of Dabro-Bosnia (1941)
 Virgin-Martyr Elena Chernova (1942)

Other commemorations
 Icon of the Most Holy Theotokos "The Unburnt Bush" (1680)  (see also: March 25)
 Translation of the relics of St. Birinus (649), Bishop of Dorchester-on-Thames and Enlightener of Wessex.
 Translation of the relics (995) of St. Cuthbert (687), Bishop of Lindisfarne.
 Uncovering of the relics (1911) of St. Ioasaph, Bishop of Belgorod (1754).
 Uncovering of the relics (1967) of St. Theodore Hatzis, the New Martyr of Mytilene (1784)
 Second uncovering of the relics (1989) of St. Metrophanes (Macarius in schema), Bishop of Voronezh (1703).
 Synaxis of the Saints of Voronezh.

Icon gallery

Notes

References

Sources
 September 4/September 17. Orthodox Calendar (PRAVOSLAVIE.RU).
 September 17 / September 4. HOLY TRINITY RUSSIAN ORTHODOX CHURCH (A parish of the Patriarchate of Moscow).
 September 4. OCA - The Lives of the Saints.
 The Autonomous Orthodox Metropolia of Western Europe and the Americas (ROCOR). St. Hilarion Calendar of Saints for the year of our Lord 2004. St. Hilarion Press (Austin, TX). p. 66.
 The Fourth Day of the Month of September. Orthodoxy in China.
 September 4. Latin Saints of the Orthodox Patriarchate of Rome.
 The Roman Martyrology. Transl. by the Archbishop of Baltimore. Last Edition, According to the Copy Printed at Rome in 1914. Revised Edition, with the Imprimatur of His Eminence Cardinal Gibbons. Baltimore: John Murphy Company, 1916. pp. 270–271.
 Rev. Richard Stanton. A Menology of England and Wales, or, Brief Memorials of the Ancient British and English Saints Arranged According to the Calendar, Together with the Martyrs of the 16th and 17th Centuries. London: Burns & Oates, 1892. pp. 435–436.

 Greek Sources
 Great Synaxaristes:  4 ΣΕΠΤΕΜΒΡΙΟΥ. ΜΕΓΑΣ ΣΥΝΑΞΑΡΙΣΤΗΣ.
  Συναξαριστής. 4 Σεπτεμβρίου. ECCLESIA.GR. (H ΕΚΚΛΗΣΙΑ ΤΗΣ ΕΛΛΑΔΟΣ).
  04/09/. Ορθόδοξος Συναξαριστής.

 Russian Sources
  17 сентября (4 сентября). Православная Энциклопедия под редакцией Патриарха Московского и всея Руси Кирилла (электронная версия). (Orthodox Encyclopedia - Pravenc.ru).
  4 сентября по старому стилю / 17 сентября по новому стилю. Русская Православная Церковь - Православный церковный календарь на  год.

September in the Eastern Orthodox calendar